An Daoquan is a fictional character in Water Margin, one of the Four Great Classical Novels of Chinese literature. Nicknamed "Divine Physician", he ranks 56th among the 108 Stars of Destiny and 20th among the 72 Earthly Fiends.

Background
An Daoquan, who bases his medical practice in Jiankang Prefecture (present-day Nanjing, Jiangsu), is nicknamed "Divine Physician" as he could cure many rare and critical illnesses. He is often compared to the legendary Han dynasty physician Hua Tuo.

Joining Liangshan
When Song Jiang is heading a military attack against Daming Prefecture (大名府; present-day Daming County, Hebei) to rescue Lu Junyi and Shi Xiu, he suddenly falls very ill with a tumour on his back. A fever comes on and never subsides, causing him to finally fall into delirium. Back in Liangshan with his troops, Song continues to be bedridden, with his condition deteriorating and all medicines to no avail.  Zhang Shun, who grew up in the Yangtze region, remembers that once his mother had a similar illness and was healed by An Daoquan. He volunteers to fetch An from Jiankang.

Zhang Shun comes to the Yangtze and boards the boat of the pirate Zhang Wang. Midway across the river, Zhang Wang pounces on him when he is asleep, ties him up and throws him into the river. An expert swimmer, Zhang Shun frees himself underwater and gets to the opposite bank, where he finds the inn of Wang Dingliu. Wang's father rents him a room and introduces his son to him.

Zhang Shun finds An Daoquan, who agrees to go to Liangshan only after his persistent plea. That night An takes Zhang along when he visits a prostitute whom he is besotted with called Li Qiaonu . Zhang is worried that An is not willing to part from Li, who keeps plying the physician with drinks until he is drunk as a fiddler. Then he discovers that Zhang Wang, apparently also a patron of Li, also calls on the woman. After the two disappeared into a room, Zhang Shun kills the mamasan and two servants of the brothel. Then he knocks on the door of Li's room and hacks her to death when she opens it. Zhang Wang, hearing the cry, gets away. Remembering what Wu Song did in Mengzhou, Zhang Shun writes with the blood of Li on the wall a supposed confession by An himself that he is the killer. When An wakes up, he has no choice but to go with Zhang Shun to Liangshan.

At Wang Dingliu's inn, Zhang Shun relates what has happened. Wang notices Zhang Wang is at the bank and asks him to ferry his two "relatives". When the boat is midstream, Zhang Shun, who has exchanged clothes with An Daoquan to deceive Zhang Wang, overcomes the boatman with the help of Wang. They tie him up and dump him into the river. Zhang Shun asks Wang to join Liangshan and the young man gladly agrees. At Liangshan, An cures Song Jiang of his life-threatening illness.

Campaigns 
An Daoquan is appointed as Liangshan's physician after the 108 Stars of Destiny came together in what is called the Grand Assembly. He participates in the campaigns against the Liao invaders and rebel forces in Song territory following amnesty from Emperor Huizong for Liangshan.

Just before the battle of Hangzhou in the campaign against Fang La, Emperor Huizong summons An Daoquan to the imperial capital Dongjing (東京; present-day Kaifeng, Henan) because he is down with a minor illness. After healing the emperor, An is retained in the palace where he serves as an imperial physician.

References
 
 
 
 
 
 
 

72 Earthly Fiends
Fictional physicians
Fictional characters from Jiangsu